The Model Car Hall of Fame is an annual awards ceremony for the die-cast toy, scale model and slot car industries.

History

Founded in 2009, initially as the Diecast Hall of Fame, the Model Car Hall of Fame is an annual award event held in Las Vegas with a number of different awards. The Hall is supported by 77 clubs, forums and blogs from 18 countries. The 2017 Award Ceremony was held on November 2nd with the 2017 class being announced:  Tim Allen as Automotive Legend, Paul G. Lang, Minichamps as Diecast Entrepreneur, Tony Karamitsos, Round 2 (the company that makes Auto World, Johnny Lightning and Racing Champions) as Diecast Designer, Joe Alvarado as Diecast Customizer, Robert Fellows as Diecast Historian and Woody Itson as Collector of the Year.

Inductees
The more than 170 inductees  include
 Carroll Shelby
 Chip Foose
 Francis Choi
 George Barris
 Jay Leno
 Larry Wood
 Mario Andretti
 Michael Zarnock
 Richard Petty
 Tim Allen

References

External links
Model Car Hall of Fame Homepage

Die-cast toys,
Halls of fame in Nevada
Awards established in 2009
2009 establishments in the United States
Toy halls of fame